Bror August Kraemer (22 February 1900 – 20 January 1990) was a Finnish high jumper. He competed at the 1924 Summer Olympics and finished in 19th place.

References

1900 births
1990 deaths
Finnish male high jumpers
Olympic athletes of Finland
Athletes (track and field) at the 1924 Summer Olympics
Sportspeople from Turku